Battle of the Masurian Lakes may refer to the following battles of World War I:

 First Battle of the Masurian Lakes, September 1914
 Second Battle of the Masurian Lakes, February 1915